The Monti Ernici (Italian: "Mountains of the Hernici") are a mountain range in central Italy, part of the sub-Apennines of Lazio. They are the natural border between two central Italian regions, Lazio (north-east of the province of Frosinone) and Abruzzo (central-western province of L'Aquila).

The peaks have an average height of 2,000 m, the highest being the Mount Passeggio (2,064 m).

At the base of the Ernici Mounts is the cave of La Foce with a spring outflow in the Aniene river.

Etymology 
The mountain range takes its name from the Hernici, an ancient Italic population of Osco-Umbrian language who lived in the area.

Points of interest 
 Giardino Botanico di Collepardo

References

Mountain ranges of the Apennines
Mountain ranges of Italy
Mountains of Abruzzo
Mountains of Lazio